Cornelia and Michael Bessie Books was an imprint at:
Harper & Row (1981-1991)
Pantheon Books (1991-1999)
Perseus Books Group (1999-2008)